The Counterfeit Traitor is a 1962 espionage thriller film starring William Holden, Hugh Griffith, and Lilli Palmer. Holden plays an American-born Swedish citizen who is forced to spy on the Nazis in World War II. It was based on a nonfiction book of the same name by Alexander Klein. The film was directed by George Seaton.

Plot
Erickson (Holden) is an American-born Swedish oil man who is pressured by Allied intelligence agents, led by a British agent (Griffith), to spy for the Allies. Erickson begins his job reluctantly, as it causes marital discord and forces him to pose as a Nazi. He agrees because otherwise his business would be destroyed by the Allies, but over time, realizes it is the right thing to do. Besides, Griffith recorded the meeting, 

He is influenced in making this moral decision by one of his contacts in Germany, a religious woman (Lilli Palmer) who gives him guidance on the meaning of life and right and wrong. Erickson has a number of close calls, but eventually escapes to Sweden in a harrowing sea voyage.

Cast
 William Holden - Eric Erickson
 Lilli Palmer - Frau Marianne Möllendorf
 Hugh Griffith - Collins
 Carl Raddatz - Otto Holtz
 Ulf Palme - Max Gumpel
 Ernst Schröder - Baron Gerhard von Oldenburg
 Charles Régnier - Wilhelm Kortner
 Ingrid van Bergen - Hulda Windler
 Helo Gutschwager - Hans Holtz
 Wolfgang Preiss - Colonel Nordoff
 Werner Peters - Bruno Ulrich
 Erica Beer - Klara Holtz
 Stefan Schnabel - Gestapo agent at funeral
 Klaus Kinski - Kindler, Jewish Refugee
 Jochen Blume - Dr. Jacob Karp
 Erik Schumann - Nazi Gunboat Officer
 Dirk Hansen - Lieutenant Nagler
 Poul Reichhardt - Fishing Boat Skipper
 Ludwig Naybert - Stationmaster
 Louis Miehe-Renard - Poul
 Kai Holm - Gunnar
 Jens Østerholm - Lars
 Eva Dahlbeck - Ingrid Erickson

See also
 List of American films of 1962
 Eric Erickson, the real-life spy on whom the book and film are based

References

External links

 

1962 films
1960s war drama films
1960s spy films
1960s thriller drama films
American spy films
American thriller drama films
American war drama films
Films about Nazi Germany
Films based on biographies
Films scored by Alfred Newman
Films directed by George Seaton
Films set in the Baltic Sea
Films set in Denmark
Paramount Pictures films
World War II spy films
1962 drama films
Films produced by William Perlberg
Films produced by George Seaton
1960s English-language films
1960s American films